Conor Joseph Hoey (born 24 May 1968) is an Irish former cricketer. A right-handed batsman and leg spin bowler, he played 42 times for the Ireland cricket team between 1991 and 1995 including four first-class matches and six List A matches. He is the father of Gavin Hoey, who is also an Irish cricketer currently playing for the Leinster Lightning in the Inter-Provincial Trophy.

Playing career

Hoey made his debut for Ireland on their tour of Zimbabwe in March 1991, taking 6/19 against Mashonaland Districts, his best bowling figures for Ireland. This tour was followed by him making his first-class debut in June that year against Scotland. He followed this with his List A debut against Middlesex and games against the West Indies, the Free Foresters, the MCC and Wales.

"Beany" continued in the Irish side in 1992, scoring 34 against Middlesex, his top score for Ireland, to start the year, followed by matches against Scotland, Durham, the MCC, Wales and Gloucestershire. Ireland gained associate membership of the International Cricket Council in 1993 and Hoey was an important part of the Irish team at that point, playing eight times in 1993, including internationals against Scotland and the Netherlands in addition to the Triple Crown Tournament.

He remained an integral part of the Irish side, playing in the inaugural ICC Trophy campaign in 1994. He took ten wickets in the tournament at an average of 23.90, winning man of the match awards against Papua New Guinea and Malaysia.

That year was rounded off with his final first-class match against Scotland and the Triple Crown Tournament in July. The following year would be his last in the Irish side, playing Benson & Hedges Cup matches against Surrey, Sussex and Kent before his final match against Scotland in his home town of Dublin.

Statistics

In all matches for Ireland, he scored 190 runs at an average of 8.26 and took 78 wickets at an average of 30.33, taking five wickets in an innings four times.

References

External links
 

1968 births
Living people
Cricketers from Dublin (city)
Irish cricketers